Research Policy is a peer-reviewed academic journal published by Elsevier on behalf of the Science Policy Research Unit (SPRU). It was established by British economist Christopher Freeman in 1971 and is regarded as the leading journal in the field of innovation studies. It is listed as one of the 50 journals used by the Financial Times to compile its business-school research ranks.

Content
The journal covers a wide range of subjects such as technological change, R&D, management of knowledge, entrepreneurship, science policy, and multiple subfields relating to innovation studies (e.g., innovation economics, innovation management, technology innovation). It is a top-ranked or top-cited journal in the fields of business and economics, management, technology and innovation management (TIM), academic entrepreneurship, and technology assessment.

History 
Based on research conducted by Joseph Schumpeter, Freeman worked to demonstrate the importance of innovation and R&D for economic development. From 1959 to 1966, Freeman worked at the National Institute of Economic and Social Research, where he carried out pioneering studies on industrial research. He played an important role in the development of the OECD's Frascati Manual. In 1966, Freeman founded the SPRU at the University of Sussex and became its first director. It became a global hub for innovation research and attracted scholars from across the world. Research Policy was established in 1971 with Freeman as editor-in-chief. In 1984, Keith Pavitt succeeded Freeman as the R.M. Phillips Professor of Science Policy and as the main editor of the journal, a post he would hold until his retirement in 2002.

Research Policy: X was Research Policys open access mirror journal that was discontinued in 2021.

Abstracting and indexing 
The journal is indexed and abstracted in the following bibliographic databases:

According to the Journal Citation Reports, the journal has a 2021 impact factor of 9.473.

Notable studies 
Notable studies published in the journal include:

References

Further reading

External links

Hybrid open access journals
Elsevier academic journals
Publications established in 1971
Innovation
Science and technology studies journals